Julia Gonsalves (born 10 September 1997) is a footballer who plays as a midfielder. Born in Canada, she represented the Guyana women's national team. She is the sister of Olivia Gonsalves.

Early life
Gonsalves was raised in Toronto, Ontario.

Club career
In 2018 and 2019, she played for Unionville Milliken SC in League1 Ontario.

International career
Gonsalves capped for Guyana at senior level during the 2018 CFU Women's Challenge Series.

See also
List of Guyana women's international footballers

References

1997 births
Living people
Citizens of Guyana through descent
Guyanese women's footballers
Women's association football midfielders
Guyana women's international footballers
Soccer players from Toronto
Canadian women's soccer players
Toronto Varsity Blues soccer players
Canadian sportspeople of Guyanese descent
Unionville Milliken SC (women) players
League1 Ontario (women) players